The Eastern Pennsylvania Geographic Union (EPGU) is the Geographical Union (GU) for rugby union teams in Eastern and Central Pennsylvania, as well as Delaware and parts of New Jersey. EPGU is part of USA Rugby.

History
The EPRU was the first Local Area Union to hold Level I & Level II Coaching Certification programs. Currently, the EPRU supports 82 full members and 64 high school teams. See :Category:Eastern Pennsylvania Rugby Union.

The EPRU became a geographic union in September 2013 and was renamed the Eastern Penn Geographic Union (EPGU).

College Championships
2004 EPRU Men's Division I Champions: University of Pennsylvania

2004 EPRU Women's Division I Champions: Princeton University

2004 EPRU Women's Division II Champions: Temple University

2005 EPRU Women's Division I Champions: Princeton University

2005 EPRU Women's Division II Champions: Kutztown University

2006 EPRU Men's Division III Champions: Harrisburg RFC

2006 EPRU Women's Division I Champions: West Chester University

2007 EPRU Men's Division I Champions: Millersville University

2007 EPRU Women's Division I Champions: West Chester University

2008 EPRU Women's Division I Champions: West Chester University

2008 EPRU Men's Division II Champions: St. Joseph's University

2008 EPRU Men's Division III Champions: Widener University

2009 EPRU Men's Division II Champions: West Chester University

2011 EPRU Men's Division III Champions: Rowan University

See also
Rugby union in the United States

References

External links

USA Rugby Official Site
IRB Official Site

 

Rugby union governing bodies in the United States